Eumaeus (Εὔμαιος, Eumaios), in Greek mythology, was Odysseus's swineherd and friend.

Eumaeus may also refer to:
 Eumaeus (butterfly), a genus of butterflies in the family Lycaenidae
 "Eumaeus" (Ulysses episode), an episode in James Joyce's novel Ulysses
 Eumaeus, a character in New Gold Dreams, a web-comic by R. K. Milholland